Ormenis may refer to:
Ormeniș, municipality in Brașov County, Romania
Ormeniș, village in Mirăslău municipality, Alba County, Romania
Ormeniș, village in Viișoara municipality, Mureș County, Romania
Ormenis, genus of insects in the family Flatidae
Cladanthus, genus of flowering plants in the family Asteraceae
Ormenis 199+69, 1969 documentary film by Markus Imhoof

See also 
Ormeniș River (disambiguation)
Urmeniș
Örményes (disambiguation)